Liina is an Estonian feminine given name and may refer to:
Liina Brunelle (born 1978), actress
Liina Kersna (born 1980), journalist and politician
Liina Laasma (born 1992), javelin thrower
Liina-Grete Lilender (born 1979), figure skater
Liina Luik (born 1985), long-distance runner
Liina Olmaru (born 1967), actress
Liina Reiman (1891–1961), actress
Liina Suurvarik (born 1980), tennis player
Liina Tennosaar (born 1965), actress
Liina Tõnisson (born 1940), politician
Liina Vahtrik (born 1972), actress

Estonian feminine given names